Madina Air was a privately owned airline based in Tripoli, Libya. It was established in 2009 in order to operate charter flights in support of oil field operations, as well as to provide some scheduled and ad hoc charter services.

Destinations 

Madina Air is starting a service from XCR (Vatry) to MJI (Tripoli) twice weekly.

Fleet
The Madina Air fleet includes the following aircraft:

1 Airbus A300-B4 (operated by [(Madina Air)]
2 Airbus A300-600 (operated by [Madina Air)]

On order 
2 Fokker 100

References 

Defunct airlines of Libya
Airlines established in 2009
Economy of Tripoli, Libya